Mark Jonathan Harris (born 1941) is an American documentary filmmaker probably best known for his films Into the Arms of Strangers: Stories of the Kindertransport (2000) and The Long Way Home (1997). He has directed three documentaries which have gone on to win Oscars, across three different decades.

Educated at Harvard, Harris co-produced the short The Redwoods for the Sierra Club with Trevor Greenwood; the short won the 1967 Academy Award for Documentary Short Subject. The aforementioned Into The Arms and Long Way Home also landed Academy Awards.

Harris started out as a crime reporter for the Chicago City News Bureau, and reports that on his first story he went into a police station and had his car stolen from in front of it. The police called him a few weeks later to ask if he had found his car. Harris tried investigative journalism next but quit after realizing he did not like to embarrass people.

Harris believes that filmmakers can construct a cinema verite film beforehand by considering repeatable events—that is, by determining which events are likely to recur frequently, and being there to film those events when they do.  He tested this theory on a film on the Peace Corps in Colombia, in a small village 50 miles outside Bogotá. The film was not especially positive about the Peace Corps experience; the Peace Corps decided not to use it for recruiting, but to use it for training people who have been in for about a year. Harris has also directed a film on migrant farmworkers and their dismal wages and living conditions;one of the "stars" of his documentary was Luis Valdez, who went on to direct the film La Bamba.

Harris' film The Long Way Home deals with the experience of Jewish refugees after World War II. Spike Lee condemned the second half of the film as propaganda for the state of Israel; nonetheless the film won an Oscar in 1997 for Best Documentary. Harris next directed a film less complimentary towards the state, which had been commissioned specifically for the 50th anniversary of Israel.  Harris intended the film, A Dream No More, to reflect Israel, "warts and all"; he spent 15 months and nearly $1.5 million U.S. making the film, which went over deadline as he tried to determine final structure for the film. He turned in a final print and had the film flagged the next day; it was never shown. Harris considers this film the second of his "Jewish trilogy". Into the Arms of Strangers: Stories of the Kindertransport, the third part of the trilogy, tells the stories of several people whose parents sent them on the kindertransport to escape the Germans, as well as one woman who was meant to go and did not because her father pulled her off the train. The film won the 2000 Academy Award for Documentary Feature. In 2003, Harris wrote Unchained Memories: Readings from the Slave Narratives. He was nominated for outstanding writing for non-fiction writing for this documentary.

As a documentary filmmaker, Harris casts his films carefully, talking to people beforehand and deciding who has an interesting story and who tells it well on camera. He also refuses to start filming immediately, but prefers to talk with the subjects for about an hour beforehand.

He is currently the producer of a documentary called "With One Hand Tied", which is based on the book "Black Warriors: The Buffalo Soldiers of World War II".

Harris is also the author of various children's books, a side career he stumbled into the mid-1980s: he returned to journalism because he could not find funding for a documentary he wanted to make. After writing an article about a young child, he was contacted by an agent who asked him to write children's literature and has since written several children's books.

Harris is currently a professor at the School of Cinematic Arts of the University of Southern California.

References

External links
 
  Mark Jonathan Harris - Official Website

American documentary filmmakers
Harvard University alumni
University of Southern California faculty
Directors of Best Documentary Feature Academy Award winners
1941 births
Living people